Egbert van 't Oever (15 July 1927 – 5 October 2001) was a Dutch speed skater. He competed at the 1952 Winter Olympics and the 1956 Winter Olympics.

Biography
Van 't Oever coached Yvonne van Gennip at the 1988 Olympic Games in Calgary where she won three gold medals. He was later coach of Marianne Timmer. Until his death, he remained active in skating as a coach.

At the end of the speed skating season, the Egbert van 't Oever Encouragement Prize is awarded to the most promising Dutch junior speed skater.

Egbert van 't Oever died at the age of 74 from the consequences of colon cancer.

Personal records

Van 't Oever has a score of 197.362 points in the  Adelskalendern

source:

References

External links
 

1927 births
2001 deaths
Dutch male speed skaters
Olympic speed skaters of the Netherlands
Speed skaters at the 1952 Winter Olympics
Speed skaters at the 1956 Winter Olympics
People from Lisse
Sportspeople from South Holland
20th-century Dutch people